The 1910 Washington Senators won 66 games, lost 85, and finished in seventh place in the American League. They were managed by Jimmy McAleer and played home games at National Park.

Regular season

Season standings

Record vs. opponents

Roster

Game log

|- style=
| 1 || April 14 || Athletics || 3–0 ||  ||  ||  ||  || 
|- style=
| 2 || April 15 || Athletics || 2–8 ||  ||  ||  ||  || 
|- style=
| 3 || April 16 || @ Athletics || 4–3 ||  ||  ||  ||  || 
|- style=
| 4 || April 19 || @ Red Sox || 1–2 ||  ||  ||  ||  || 
|-
| 5 || April 19 || @ Red Sox || 4–5 ||  ||  ||  ||  || 
|-
| 6 || April 20 || @ Red Sox || 12–4 ||  ||  ||  ||  || 
|-
| 7 || April 21 || @ Red Sox || 3–10 ||  ||  ||  ||  || 
|-
| 8 || April 22 || Highlanders || 1–3 ||  ||  ||  ||  || 
|-
| 9 || April 23 || Highlanders || 0–0 ||  ||  ||  ||  ||
|-
| 10 || April 25 || Highlanders || 2–5 ||  ||  ||  ||  ||
|-
| 11 || April 26 || Highlanders || 9–7 ||  ||  ||  ||  ||
|-
| 12 || April 27 || Red Sox || 1–11 ||  ||  ||  ||  ||
|-
| 13 || April 29 || Red Sox || 2–1 ||  ||  ||  ||  ||
|-
| 13 || April 30 || Red Sox || 3–9 ||  ||  ||  ||  ||
|-

Player stats

Batting

Starters by position 
Note: Pos = Position; G = Games played; AB = At bats; H = Hits; Avg. = Batting average; HR = Home runs; RBI = Runs batted in

Other batters 
Note: G = Games played; AB = At bats; H = Hits; Avg. = Batting average; HR = Home runs; RBI = Runs batted in

Pitching

Starting pitchers 
Note: G = Games pitched; IP = Innings pitched; W = Wins; L = Losses; ERA = Earned run average; SO = Strikeouts

Other pitchers 
Note: G = Games pitched; IP = Innings pitched; W = Wins; L = Losses; ERA = Earned run average; SO = Strikeouts

Relief pitchers 
Note: G = Games pitched; W = Wins; L = Losses; SV = Saves; ERA = Earned run average; SO = Strikeouts

References 
1910 Washington Senators at Baseball-Reference
1910 Washington Senators team page at www.baseball-almanac.com

Minnesota Twins seasons
Washington Senators season
Washington